Ruapehu District Council is the territorial authority for the Ruapehu District of New Zealand.

The council consists of the mayor of Ruapehu, and 11 ward councillors.

Composition

Councillors

 Mayor: 
 Taumarunui Ward: five councillors
 National Park Ward: one councillor
 Ohura Ward: one councillor
 Waimarino-Waiouru Ward: four councillors

Community boards

 National Park Community Board: four elected members, a councillor
 Taumarunui/Ohura Ward Committee: five Taumarunui Ward councillors, one Ohura Ward councillor
 Waimarino-Waiouru Community Board: four elected members, a councillor

History

The council was established in 1989, through the merger of Taumarunui County Council (established in 1910), Ohakune County Council (established in 1911), and Raetihi County Council (established in 1921).

References

External links
 Official website

Ruapehu District
Politics of Manawatū-Whanganui
Politics of Taranaki
Politics of Waikato
Territorial authorities of New Zealand